XM1 may refer to:

 3730 Hurban (1983 XM1), a main-belt asteroid
 The Fujifilm X-M1, a mirrorless digital camera
 The M1 Abrams (or XM1 prototype), a US main battle tank
 The Marske XM-1, an experimental glider plane
 An Sirius XM Satellite Radio broadcast satellite, XM-1 "Rock"

See also

 XM (disambiguation)
 XMI (disambiguation)
 XML (disambiguation)